The 48th Japan National University Rugby Championship (2011/2012).

Qualifying Teams
Kanto League A (Taiko)
 Teikyo University, Waseda University, Meiji, University of Tsukuba, Keio

Kanto League B
 Ryutsu Keizai University, Tokai University, Kanto Gakuin University, Daito Bunka University, Hosei University

Kansai League
 Tenri University, Doshisha University, Osaka University of Health and Sport Sciences, Ritsumeikan University, Kwansei Gakuin University

Kyushu League
 Fukuoka Institute of Technology

Knockout stage

Final

Universities Competing
 Teikyo University
 Waseda
 Meiji
 University of Tsukuba
 Keio University
 Ryutsu Keizai University
 Tokai University
 Kanto Gakuin University
 Daito Bunka University
 Hosei University
 Tenri University
 Doshisha University
 Osaka University of Health and Sport Sciences
 Ritsumeikan University
 Kwansei Gakuin
 Fukuoka Institute of Technology

External links
 The 48th Japan University Rugby Championship - JRFU Official Page (Japanese)
 Rugby union in Japan

All-Japan University Rugby Championship
Univ